The nine-rank system, also known as the nine-grade controller system, was used to categorize and classify government officials in Imperial China. Created in the state of Cao Wei during the Three Kingdoms, it was used until the Song dynasty, and similar ranking systems were also present in the Ming dynasty and Qing dynasty. 

Prior to the nine-rank system, official positions were denoted by their salary paid in number of bushels of grain. For example, during the Han dynasty, the highest-ranking officials were classed as wandan (萬石), meaning ten thousand bushels, and were paid 350 bushels of grain per month. The lowest ranking petty subofficials were paid in pecks, worth less than 100 bushels per year.

A similar system was also used in Korea. In Japan, the Twelve Level Cap and Rank System was adopted in 603 during the reign of Empress Suiko.

History

Background
The Nine-rank system was a reorganization of the Han dynasty practice of recommending noteworthy locals for political office. Since 134 BCE, during the reign of Emperor Wu of Han, the Han court relied mainly on nomination by local magnates and officials as a way of identifying talent, by nominating them under titles such as Xiaolian (Filial and Incorrupt) or Maocai (of Outstanding Talent).

The nine-rank system was created after the end of the Han in 220 AD when Chen Qun, a court official from the state of Cao Wei, proposed it as a way of organizing the state bureaucracy. It was called the "nine-rank method for recruiting men for office" (Jiǔ pǐn guān rén fǎ). During the Song dynasty it became the "system of Nine ranks and impartial judges."

Chen Qun's reform was a way of systematizing the selection of candidates for political appointments in two ways: by creating a common scale of nine ranks to evaluate a person and by appointing ontrollers in the court to grade officials on the scale. In practice, not only potential entrants but also existing officials were graded, creating two parallel systems: a "candidacy grade"  and a "service grade" . The system was ostensibly based on a few criteria: moral probity, administrative ability, and the contributions of the person or his family to the newly-created Cao Wei regime. In practice, descent also played an important role; the service grade of a candidate's father had a bearing on their candidacy grade.

The nine-rank system was originally intended to centralize the power of nominating and selecting appointees to office into the imperial court at Luoyang, but conflict remained between the right of evaluation between centrally-appointed Controllers and the governors of the regions. Nonetheless, the continued instability and turmoil of the Three Kingdoms period meant that the nine-rank system was not fully or solely implemented; mentions of the old nomination system as the basis for identifying talent remain prevalent in early Cao Wei writings.

The nine-rank system would become more dominant in the later years of the Cao Wei regime under the regency of the Sima clan and into the early years of the Jin regime during which it had changed in nature. Under Sima Yan, the power of Controllers was expanded to include not only evaluation but also the nomination of talent, and with the conquest of Wu by Jin and the subsequent peace, the system also became more systematized and formalized. Through the changes, the ine-rank system also became more closely aligned with the interests of the powerful official clans who had come to dominate imperial politics since the Cao Wei period. The expanded powers of the appointed Controllers in turn meant that the officials who held the post, many of whom came from these clans, could use their powers to promote the interests of their own scions.

While the nine-rank system helped powerful clans to dominate official posts in the court, it also helped stimulate private schooling within families as a means of transmitting knowledge that could increase one's standing as someone eligible for evaluation. An example of this intrafamilial transmission of skills is the calligrapher Wang Xizhi, of the Wang clan of Langya that was prominent during the Eastern Jin, whose sons, Wang Ningzhi, Wang Huizhi and Wang Xianzhi, were all famed calligraphers in their own right. The emphasis placed by the nine-rank system on moral attributes such as filial piety also led to the growth of "familial instructions", which aimed to transmit moral teachings to children, as a genre of writing in the Jin and subsequent dynasties.

During the Northern Wei, ranks four to nine added additional upper and lower ranks to the standard and secondary ranks, giving the nine-rank system a total of 30 ranks (6 in the top 3 ranks; 24 from ranks 4 to 9).

After the Northern Song the nine ranks reverted to the original standard of 18 ranks, with each rank containing only two classes.

Organization

The nine ranks were separated into Upper, Middle, and Lower classes, each composed of three ranks, making nine in total. Each rank was also further classified into standard and secondary ranks and so the entire system contained 18 ranks.

Ranks were expressed thus:

正一品 (Zheng yi pin; Standard class, Rank 1),

從一品 (Cong yi pin; Secondary class, Rank 1),

正四品上 (Zheng si pin shang; Standard class, Rank 4, Upper grade),

從四品下 (Cong si pin xia; Secondary class, Rank 4, Lower grade).

The primary avenues to entering the nine ranks were through sponsorship, recommendation (zheng pi; 征辟) and examination (cha ju; 察舉). Recommendations were made by local recruiters (Zhongzheng; 中正) based on social status, morals, and ability, of which social status soon became the most important criterion. During the Sui and Tang dynasties, recommendations were marginalized and phased out of the recruiting process although sponsorship continued to play an important part in reaching the examinations until the Song era. Them, candidates were able to present themselves for exams independently, and bureaucratic staff who were recruited directly through the imperial examination system became the norm.

Aside from official ranked titles, officials also received prestige titles (散官), which were normally based on seniority.

See also
 Number nine in Chinese culture
 Twelve Level Cap and Rank System

References

Bibliography

Cao Wei
Northern and Southern dynasties
Sui dynasty
Goguryeo
Baekje